Head Cage is the sixth studio album by American grindcore band Pig Destroyer. The album was released on September 7, 2018 through Relapse Records. The album features vocal cameos from Richard Johnson and Kat Katz from Agoraphobic Nosebleed, along with Dylan Walker from Full of Hell.

The band commented in an official description of Head Cage:

Background
It is the band's only album with bassist John Jarvis in their line-up. MetalSucks called the album an "immediate frontrunner for the best metal album of 2018." The band released a teaser for the album on June 27, 2018.

Reception

Accolades

Track listing

Personnel
Pig Destroyer
 J. R. Hayes – lead vocals
 Scott Hull - guitars
 John Jarvis – bass, gang vocals
 Blake Harrison - noise, samples, gang vocals
 Adam Jarvis – drums, gang vocals

Additional musicians
 Richard Johnson − guest vocals (track 3), gang vocals
 Kat Katz − guest vocals (tracks 6, 7)
 Jason Hodges − guest vocals (track 8)
 Dylan Walker − noise (track 11)
 Aaron "Baron" Kirkpatrick − gang vocals

Production
 Scott Hull − recording
 Will Putney − mixing, mastering
 Mark McCoy − artwork, layout
 Mark Valentino − photography

Charts

References

2018 albums
Pig Destroyer albums
Relapse Records albums